The Argus 115 hp aircraft engine from 1913 was a six-cylinder, water cooled inline engine built by the German Argus Motoren company.

Design and development
The Argus 115 hp engine was a development from the earlier Argus 110 hp engine of 1912. 
The normal speed of the engine has been reported as 1,350 rpm.

Relative to the Argus 110 hp engine the main improvement besides the increased bore appears to be the introduction of a second magneto. 
To achieve this, the arrangement of the external engine components had been changed, with the water pump, now on the left side of the engine, directly coupled with one of the magnetos. 
The second magneto was driven via spur gears from the crankshaft and was located on the right hand side of the engine.
The oil pump also had been relocated, now sitting separately on the engine case to the left, driven via spur gears from the camshaft at the propeller end.

While this engine is referred to as 105/115 hp Argus or 115 hp Argus in some publications, these engines typically were referred to as '100 hp Argus' engines in most contemporary reports, which at times makes it difficult to distinguish them from the 100 hp four-cylinder Argus As I or the Argus 110 hp.

First accounts for the use of this engine can be found in the reports for the 'Prinz-Heinrich-Flug' flying competition of 1913, which took place from May 10–17, 1913. Two aircraft with this engine have been enlisted, a Jeannin-Taube flown by Lt. Coerper, and an L.V.G.-biplane flown by Lt. Carganico, both powered by the Argus six-cylinder engine of 130 mm bore and stroke.

Applications 
Jeannin Stahltaube (1913)
L.V.G.-biplane (1913)
Sikorsky Ilya Muromets No. 107, fitted with two  Salmson 2M7 and two Argus 115 hp engines.

Specifications

See also

References

Notes

Bibliography 

1910s aircraft piston engines
Argus aircraft engines